Aleh Kavalyow (born 24 May 1987) is a Belarusian professional footballer who plays for Gomel.

Honours
Gomel
Belarusian Cup winner: 2021–22

External links

1987 births
Living people
Belarusian footballers
Association football goalkeepers
FC Gomel players
FC DSK Gomel players
FC Rechitsa-2014 players